The Jardin botanique de Bordeaux (0.5 hectares) is the historical municipal botanical garden, located inside of the Jardin public" (Public garden), at Place Bardineau, Bordeaux, Gironde, Aquitaine, France.

It is open daily without charge. This old garden has been recently supplemented by the modern Jardin botanique de la Bastide, located across the river.

Although the garden's origins extend back to 1629 AD, with the creation of Bordeaux's first medicinal garden, today's botanical garden dates to 1858. It currently contains more than 3000 plant species, both those indigenous to Aquitaine and exotic plants from North America, China and Japan. It is organized as a systematic collection. The garden's seed collection contains 2,000 taxa, and its herbarium contains about 85,000 specimens.

See also 
 Jardin botanique de la Bastide
 List of botanical gardens in France

References 

 Jardin botanique de Bordeaux
 BGCI entry
 1001 Fleurs entry (French)
 Je Decouvre La France entry (French)
 Philippe Prévost and Richard Zéboulon, Les plus beaux jardins du sud-ouest, éditions sud-ouest, 

Bordeaux
Bordeaux, Jardin botanique de
Bordeaux, Jardin botanique de
Tourist attractions in Bordeaux